In computing, exit is a command used in many operating system command-line shells and scripting languages.

The command causes the shell or program to terminate. If performed within an interactive command shell, the user is logged out of their current session, and/or user's current console or terminal connection is disconnected. Typically an optional exit code can be specified, which is typically a simple integer value that is then returned to the parent process.

Implementations
Operating systems, shells and scripting languages providing this command include Microsoft MSX-DOS version 2, IBM OS/2, DR FlexOS, HP MPE/iX, KolibriOS, SymbOS, cmd.exe, sh, ksh, Perl, AWK, PHP, TCL, PowerShell  and others.

On MS-DOS, the command is available in versions 2 and later. DR DOS 6.0 and Datalight ROM-DOS also include an implementation of the  command. It is also available in the open source MS-DOS emulator DOSBox.

The numerical computing environment MATLAB includes an exit function with similar functionality.

See also
exit (system call)
Exit status
List of Unix commands
List of DOS commands

References

Further reading

External links

 exit: cause the shell to exit – Commands & Utilities Reference, The Single UNIX® Specification, Issue 7 from The Open Group
exit | Microsoft Docs

Internal DOS commands
MSX-DOS commands
OS/2 commands
ReactOS commands
Windows administration
Unix SUS2008 utilities
Unix process- and task-management-related software
IBM i Qshell commands